The 2003 Conference USA baseball tournament was the 2003 postseason baseball championship of the NCAA Division I Conference USA, held at Turchin Stadium in New Orleans, Louisiana, from May 21 through 25. Southern Miss defeated Tulane in the championship game, earning the conference's automatic bid to the 2003 NCAA Division I baseball tournament.

Regular season results 

 Records reflect conference play only.

Bracket 

 Bold indicates the winner of the game.
 Italics indicate that the team was eliminated from the tournament.

All-tournament team

References 

Tournament
Conference USA Baseball Tournament
Conference USA baseball tournament
Conference USA baseball tournament
2000s in New Orleans
Baseball competitions in New Orleans
College baseball tournaments in Louisiana